Louise Palanker is a co-founder of Premiere Networks, host of the teen social network Our Place, and director of the documentary Family Band: The Cowsills Story.

Palanker is the author of the semi-auto-biographical, coming of age story, Journals: Middle School Love and War. She developed this title into an iOS app called Our Place within which she fields questions from teens about growing up and allows kids to connect safely with one another. Our Place also includes a weekly video podcast called Our Place Out Loud. Palanker has produced and directed two documentary films: Family Band: The Cowsills Story (airing on Showtime in 2013–2014) and We Played Marbles: Remembering a Stolen Childhood (2007), about the lives of Holocaust survivors.

In 1999, she began a stand-up comedy program, Kid's Comedy Club, at two Los Angeles Boys and Girls Clubs and the Santa Barbara Jewish Federation, where kids learn to write and perform their own stand-up comedy.

In March 2005, Palanker made headlines while testifying in the trial of Michael Jackson as a witness for the prosecution. The prosecution called Palanker to testify about a call she received from the accuser's mother, and to rebut defense suggestions that the family tried to dupe celebrities, including Palanker, George Lopez and Jay Leno, into giving them money. Despite Palanker's testimony, pop superstar Jackson was found not guilty on all charges.

She lives in Los Angeles and Santa Barbara, California, with her husband.

References

External links
 Louise Palanker's website

American comedy writers
American television producers
American women television producers
Living people
Year of birth missing (living people)
21st-century American women